Luca Boschi (born 29 December 1972) is a Sammarinese politician and one of the Captains Regent, who served with Mariella Mularoni from 1 October 2019 until 1 April 2020.

Life
Boschi was born in Italy and grew up in Milan. After graduating in the subject of International Business Marketing from Cardiff University in Wales, he returned to San Marino and worked as a freelancer in the private sector. He joined the political party Civic 10, and has served as a member of the Grand and General Council since December 2016.

References

1972 births
Living people
People from Piacenza
Sammarinese people of Italian descent
Alumni of Cardiff University
Captains Regent of San Marino
Members of the Grand and General Council
Civic 10 politicians